The Lazio regional election of 2018 took place in Lazio, Italy, on 4 March 2018, concurrently with the Italian general election and the Lombard regional election. 

The election was won by centre-left incumbent President Nicola Zingaretti, with just under a third of the vote, over the centre-right one Stefano Parisi, who gain 31%, and the Five Star Movement's candidate Roberta Lombardi with 27%.

Electoral system
The Regional Council is elected with a mixed system: 39 MPs are chosen with a form of proportional representation using a largest remainder method with open lists and a 5% threshold, while 11 MPs are elected with a block voting system with closed lists. One seat is for the elected president.

Parties and candidate

Opinion polls

Results

Aftermath

2018 motion of no confidence
On 1 December 2018, a motion of no confidence in the government of Nicola Zingaretti tabled by centre-right coalition was defeated 22 to 26, with one no-vote of Forza Italia and a few absent.

References

2018 elections in Italy
21st century in Lazio
Elections in Lazio
March 2018 events in Italy